A locality, in general, is a place that is settled by humans. In the Canadian province of Alberta, a locality is an unincorporated place, community, or area with a limited or scattered population.

Alberta had 864 localities within its Geographical Names System (GNS) in October 2020. Excluding municipalities, hamlets, and airports, Statistics Canada recognized 2,342 localities in Alberta in its 2006 Census of Population, of which 830 are also in Alberta's GNS. Between the two authorities there are 2,372 localities in Alberta.


List

See also 
List of census divisions of Alberta
List of communities in Alberta
List of designated places in Alberta
List of ghost towns in Alberta
List of hamlets in Alberta
List of municipalities in Alberta
List of cities in Alberta
List of towns in Alberta
List of summer villages in Alberta
List of villages in Alberta
List of population centres in Alberta
List of settlements in Alberta

References 

Localities